Schloss (pl. Schlösser), formerly written Schloß, is the German term for a building similar to a château, palace, or manor house. 

Related terms appear in several Germanic languages. In the Scandinavian languages, the cognate word slot/slott is normally used for what in English could be either a palace or a castle (instead of words in rarer use such as palats/palæ, kastell, or borg). In Dutch, the word slot is considered to be more archaic. Nowadays, one commonly uses paleis or kasteel. But in English, the term does not appear, for instance, in the United Kingdom, this type of structure would be known as a stately home or country house.

Most Schlösser were built after the Middle Ages as residences for the nobility, not as true fortresses, although originally, they often were fortified. The usual German term for a true castle is burg, that for a fortress is festung, and — the slightly more archaic term — veste. However, many castles were called schloss, especially those that were adapted as residences after they lost their defensive significance. Many adaptations took into account new tastes arising during the Renaissance and Baroque periods.

Like a castle, a schloss often is surrounded by a moat and then, it is called a Wasserschloss (water castle). Other related structure types include the Stadtschloss (a city palace), the Jagdschloss (a hunting lodge), and the Lustschloss (a pleasure palace or summer residence).

Examples of schlösser 

Although they appeared much earlier than the period defined by the term, sometimes, medieval Carolingian Kaiserpfalzen structures are considered as being Schlösser in nature. Among those that would qualify are, the Palace of Aachen and the Imperial Palace of Goslar.

Gothic
 Schloss Albrechtsburg in Meißen, considered to be Germany's oldest Schloss
 Schloss Allner
 Schloss Blutenburg in Munich, a "castle" in English, but a Schloss in German

Renaissance
 Schloss Glücksburg
 Schloss Güstrow
 Schloss Johannisburg
 Schloss Mespelbrunn
 Schloss Neuburg

Baroque
 Schloss Belvedere in Vienna
 Schloss Esterhazy in Eisenstadt
 Schloss Hellbrunn in Salzburg
 Schloss Ludwigsburg
 Schloss Ludwigslust
 Schloss Mirabell in Salzburg
 Schloss Moritzburg
 Schloss Nymphenburg in Munich
 Schloss Pillnitz
 Stadtschloss Potsdam
 Schloss Rastatt
 Schloss Sanssouci
 Schloss Schleißheim in Oberschleißheim, a northern suburb of Munich
 Schloss Schönbrunn in Vienna
 Schloss Schwetzingen

Neo-Baroque
 Schloss Linderhof
 Schloss Herrenchiemsee

Neoclassicism
 Schloss Charlottenhof
 Schloss Glienicke
 Schloss Weimar
 Schloss Wilhelmshöhe
 Schloss Bellevue

Historicism
 Schloss Babelsberg
 Schloss Callenberg
 Schloss Drachenburg
 Schloss Granitz
 Schloss Marienburg
 Orangerieschloss Potsdam
 Schloss Schwerin
 Schloss Stolzenfels
 Burg Hohenzollern, a "castle" both in English and German, when really a fully-flung Schloss
 Schloss Ringberg in Kreuth, Bavaria

Cross overs 
(Relating to places in use for long periods of times, having been extended and perhaps having had renovations in different styles than those of their respective eras – and therefore, displaying at least two and often, multiple styles)
 Stadtschloss Berlin
 Münchner Residenz
 Stadtschloss Darmstadt
 Schloss Weilburg

Note 
In another context, Schloss is also the German word for a lock.

See also 
Burg (disambiguation)
Festung
Residenz

References

External links 

Buildings and structures by type

Architecture in Germany